Frege is a surname. Notable people with the surname include:

 Carola Frege (born 1965), German scholar 
 Élodie Frégé, French singer and actress 
 Gottlob Frege (1848 –1925), German philosopher, logician, and mathematician
 Livia Frege (1818–1891), German soprano

Surnames